Alfrick is a village and civil parish in the Malvern Hills district of Worcestershire, England, about seven miles west of Worcester.

Amenities 
The 2001 census counted 511 people.  Once an agricultural farming village, Alfrick is now mainly a dormitory village for nearby Worcester and Malvern.

Alfrick is probably currently best known for the annual Alfrick and Lulsley Village Show which attracts visitors from across the West Midlands.

There is a village hall and a recreational field. The war memorial on the village green   lists the names of 95 men killed in war. The village shop and Post Office closed in July 2011 when the owners retired. In June 2012 The Alfrick and Lulsley Community Shop opened. It is a community-owned food shop, café and Post Office run by a part-time manager and several volunteers.

Nearby is the Knapp and Papermill nature reserve owned by the Worcestershire Wildlife Trust. In 2012 the Trust agreed to buy a small area of woodland adjoining the reserve.

History 

Alfrick was in the upper division of Doddingtree Hundred.

Following the Poor Law Amendment Act 1834 Alfrick Parish ceased to be responsible for maintaining the poor in its parish. This responsibility was transferred to Martley Poor Law Union.

The village had a pub, the Swan, in its centre until about 2000.

The village church is dedicated to Saint Mary Magdalene    It has original sandstone window casings, Dutch stained glass and exposed internal roof beams. On the exterior of its tower is a sundial

References

External links

 Parish council web site (accessed June 2020)
 Village website (information about the church, hall, and show, etc.)
 St Mary Magdalene (The Corpus of ROMANESQUE SCULPTURE in Britain and Ireland)
 Alfrick and Lulsley Community Shop (The community shop website)

Villages in Worcestershire
Civil parishes in Worcestershire
Nature reserves in Worcestershire